Sir Jenison William Gordon, 2nd Baronet (1747 – 9 May 1831 in Ewerby, Lincolnshire) succeeded his father, Sir Samuel Gordon, 1st Baronet, in 1780.

In October 1781 he married Harriet Frances Charlotte Finch (d. 1821), second daughter of the Hon. Edward Finch Hatton, who in turn was the youngest son of Daniel Finch, 7th Earl of Winchilsea and 2nd Earl of Nottingham. Debrett, in 1815, states that Sir Jenison Gordon had his seat at Haverholm (sic) Priory, Lincolnshire.

In 1783 he served as High Sheriff of Lincolnshire. He is also listed as having served as a Deputy Lieutenant for the North Division of Kesteven in 1830.

Sir Jenison Gordon died at Haverholme Priory, in May 1831. He and Lady Harriet had no children, and so the Gordon baronetcy of Newark-upon-Trent became extinct. His estates, which at the time were described by The Times as “extensive”, passed to George William Finch-Hatton, 10th Earl of Winchilsea and 5th Earl of Nottingham. During his occupancy of Haverholme Priory, Sir Jenison had made substantial additions and improvements to the house, “and in a style corresponding to the circumstances of the place”.

References

1747 births
1831 deaths
Baronets in the Baronetage of Great Britain
High Sheriffs of Lincolnshire
Deputy Lieutenants of Lincolnshire